Charnockite, St. Thomas Mount, located to the south of the Chennai city, in Pallavaram suburb, Tamil Nadu, is a characteristically profuse exposure of quartz–feldspar–hypersthene rock, illustrated by occurrence of two pyroxene facies metamorphism.

The name "Charnockite, St. Thomas Mount" originated from the use of the rocks quarried from a central band in the St.Thomas Mount for the tombstone of Job Charnock, the founder of Kolkata in 1679. Several incidents in Charnock's life are linked to Charnockite rock, Chennai city (formerly Madras) and the St. Thomas Mount.

Geography and topography

Charnockite rock series is an ancient formation, similar to granite, which has intruded into igneous rocks. It is found not only in St. Thomas Mount but also extends south of the Chingleput in Tamil Nadu. It is also traced to the Nilgiri hills with southern trend extending to the Malabar district, and former feudal states of Cochin and Travancore, princely towns in Kerala. It rises further above the sea level to form the great mass of Sri Lanka (Ceylon).

History

One of the earliest memorials in Chennai is the peaceful little Portuguese chapel on top of the hill (a flight of 132 steps leads to the summit) and built at the site where St. Thomas, the Apostle of India, was martyred in 72 A.D. and thereafter the hill has been famously known as the St. Thomas Mount.

The earliest recorded history related to the Charnockite is of an announcement made in 1892 by Thomas Oldham of the Geological Survey of India, of the occurrence of hypersthene granite in South India. In 1893, Dr T.H.Holland, the then Chief of the Geological Survey of India reported that the Hypderstehene granites found in Madras (Chennai) was associated with large masses of norite. It was also noted that the same type of stone was used for the tombstone of Job Charnock and that it was extracted from the neighbourhood of St Thomas Mount.
Following the above finding, in 1893, Holland, had read a paper at the Asiatic Society of Bengal titled "The Petrology of Job Charnock's Tombstone" and suggested that the rock which was of a new type be named as the ‘Charnockite rock’ in honour of the founder of Calcutta who had become the unaware means of bringing this rock to Calcutta. Thus, 200 years after his death the rock from Pallavaram (suburb of Chennai) was named Charnockite.

Recent studies in 1950 by Pascoe suggest that the material used in Charnock's tombstone was quarried from a central band in the St. Thomas Mount.

In 1975, the Geological Survey of India declared the monument "Charnockite, St. Thomas Mount" in memory of Job Charnock for whom the stone from this hill, (which was then called the Pallavaram Gneiss) was shipped to Calcutta for building his tomb. Since then "Charnockite" is also prefixed with the famous "St. Thomas Mount".

Job Charnock, a servant and administrator of the English East India Company, is credited for founding the city of Calcutta in 1686, 50 years after the city of Madras was founded.

Several incidents of Charnock's association with Madras and the St. Thomas Mount have been cited. In 1655, he arrived in Madras and proceeded to Bengal where he was to serve in Cossim Bazar. Subsequently, he went to Patna (1657), in Bihar and in 1686 he became the Agent of the Company. He fled to Madras in 1689 as he was thrown out by the local Muslim rulers during the Anglo–Moghal war. He was given protection by Governor Elihu Yale at Madras for 18 months and who also supported him fully to return to Bengal. This subsequently resulted in establishing Kolkatta in 1690 by Job Charnock. He rescued an Indian women from Bihar, who was about to commit Sati on the funeral pyre of her husband, by gallantly blazing with guns, and later married her and renamed her as Maria. They had one son (who predeceased them) and three daughters –Mary, Elizabeth and Catherine – who married men of the reputed John Company Establishment in Bengal –. They were baptized on 19 August 1689 in front the Baptismal Font (picture of the Font and the plaque in the gallery testifies the dates) of black Pallavaram granite that existed on the Mount since 1680 (but shifted to the St Mary's Church at Fort St. George in 1885).

Geology
The constituents of the rock suggests of its origin in particularly dry and high temperature conditions which is deduced to have an important bearing in explicating prehistoric crustal development of the earth.
From the time Holland, named the rock as Charnockite, its characteristics have been extensively studied by several researches in Earth Sciences over the century. An analysis of three charnockites in the region, extending from St. Thomas Mount – Pallavaram –Tambaram, south of the city of Chennai, carried out on the compositional characteristics of coexisting orthopyroxene, garnet and biotite has established several petrographic varieties within the charnockites–enderbites such as the granulites and gneisses corresponding to adamellite, monzonite, granite and others.
Another study on the general characteristics of the rocks of this series has recorded that the rocks are in general bluish gray or darkish in colour and extremely fresh in appearance with an even grained granular structure. The mineral composition shows an unvarying presence of pleochroic rhombic pyroxene. The other femic minerals noted are augite and hornblende with minute grains of opaque iron ores and these minerals have been noted to cluster together. Plagioclase feldspars, alkali feldspars and quartz are the sialic minerals present in this series of rocks.

In order to determine the geological age of the charnockitic region of the Pallavaram area in the Madras (Chennai) Block, palaeomagnetic investigations were carried out at 12 sites, which suggested an age of magnetization in the Pallavaram charnockites as 2600 Ma while in the St. Thomas Mount the period of emplacement was assessed as 1650 Ma (Mesoproterozoic). There was a further inference that the Madras block granulites indicated crustal evolution similar to those in the Eastern Ghats belt with identical palaeopoles from both the areas. The study also noted that "pressure, temperature and the chemical potential of water were constant for assemblages separated by large distances."

Trivia

An interesting Oscar Wilde memorial monument erected in the year 2000 on the centenary of his death, seen in Merrion Square, Dublin, Ireland opposite to his childhood house, is reclining on a 35-ton boulder of quartz from the Wicklow Mountains, Ireland. The statue (pictured) is splendidly sculpted out of semi–precious stones with blue pearlgranite trousers (Larvikite known as blue granite from the western shores of Oslo Fjord in Norway, jacket of Nephrite jade [originally a  block from the Yukon], Canada, the red cuffs and collar made of Thulite from Norway, shoes and socks made of black charnockite granite from India and holding a green carnation to his breast.

Access

Chennai, as the capital of Tamil Nadu, is very well connected by road, rail, sea and air with rest of the country and the world. Within the city, it is in the neighborhood of Guindy,  from Fort St. George,  from South west of Santhome-de-Meliyapore (burial ground of St. Thomas), and close to the flying range. Chennai Suburban Railway South line has a railway station at St. Thomas,  from starting point.

Gallery

See also
 St. Thomas Mount
 Charnockites
 Job Charnock

References

Geology of India
Kanchipuram district
National Geological Monuments in India